Thomas Threader Garland  (7 February 1877 – 7 July 1964) was a New Zealand businessman, broadcaster, Methodist lay preacher and choirmaster. He was born in London, England, on 7 February 1877.

In the 1951 King's Birthday Honours, Garland was appointed a Member of the Order of the British Empire for services to the community, especially as a conductor of children's choirs.

References

1877 births
1964 deaths
New Zealand businesspeople
New Zealand Methodists
Singers from London
19th-century New Zealand male singers
English emigrants to New Zealand
New Zealand Members of the Order of the British Empire
20th-century New Zealand male singers